The Yale Bulldogs football program represents Yale University in college football at the NCAA Division I Football Championship Subdivision (formerly Division I-AA). Yale's football program is one of the oldest in the world, having begun competing in the sport in 1872. The Bulldogs have a legacy that includes 27 national championships, two of the first three Heisman Trophy winners (Larry Kelley in 1936 and Clint Frank in 1937), 100 consensus All-Americans, 28 College Football Hall of Fame inductees, including the "Father of American Football" Walter Camp, the first professional football player Pudge Heffelfinger, and coaching giants Amos Alonzo Stagg, Howard Jones, Tad Jones and Carmen Cozza. With over 900 wins, Yale ranks in the top ten for most wins in college football history.

History

Early history

The Bulldogs were the dominant team in the early days of intercollegiate football, winning 27 college football national championships, including 26 in 38 years between 1872 and 1909.  Walter Camp, known as the "Father of Football," graduated from Hopkins Grammar School in 1876, and played college football at Yale College from 1876 to 1882.  He later served as the head football coach at Yale from 1888 to 1892. It was Camp who pioneered the fundamental transition of American football from rugby when in 1880, he succeeded in convincing the Intercollegiate Football Association to discontinue the rugby "scrum," and instead have players line up along a "line of scrimmage" for individual plays, which begin with the snap of the ball and conclude with the tackling of the ballcarrier. In 1916, against the advisement of coach Tad Jones, Yale quarterback Chester J. LaRoche (1918s) helped lead the Yale team in a win against Princeton by turning the momentum of the game with a fourth-down call in the huddle to go for first down rather than punt. The team made the down and went on to win the game in one of Yale's greatest victories in its history. LaRoche went on to spearhead the creation of the National Football Foundation and Hall of Fame.

Formation of the Ivy League
When the Ivy League athletic conference was formed in 1955, conference rules prohibited post-season play in football.  While Yale had always abstained from post-season play, other member schools had participated in bowls before, and the new policy further insulated Yale and the Ivy League from the national spotlight.

NCAA Division I subdivision split
The NCAA decided to split Division I into two subdivisions in 1978, then called I-A for larger schools, and I-AA for the smaller ones.  The NCAA had devised the split, in part, with the Ivy League in mind, but the conference did not move down for four seasons despite the fact that there were many indications that the ancient eight were on the wrong side of an increasing disparity between the big and small schools.  In 1982, the NCAA created a rule that stated a program's average attendance must be at least 15,000 to qualify for I-A membership.  This forced the conference's hand, as only some of the member schools met the attendance qualification.  Choosing to stay together rather than stand their ground separately in the increasingly competitive I-A subdivision, the Ivy League moved down into I-AA starting with the 1982 season.

Conference affiliations
Yale has been both an independent and affiliated with the Ivy League.
 Independent (1872–1955)
 Ivy League (1956–present)

Championships

National championships 
Yale has won 27 national championships from NCAA-designated major selectors. Yale claims each of these championships.

Conference championships
Yale has won 17 conference championships, all in the Ivy League, as of 2022 with nine outright and eight shared.

† Co-championship

Head coaches
Career records of Yale head coaches.

Rivalries

Harvard

Harvard and Yale have been competing against each other in football since 1875.  The annual rivalry game between the two schools, known as "The Game", is played in November at the end of the football season.  As of 2022, Yale leads the series 69-61-8.

The Game is the second oldest continuing rivalry and also the third most-played rivalry game in college football history, after the Lehigh–Lafayette Rivalry (1884) and the Princeton–Yale game (1873).  Sports Illustrated On Campus rated the Harvard–Yale rivalry the sixth-best in college athletics in 2003.

Harvard had been unbeaten versus Yale from 2007 to 2015. The nine game winning streak was the longest during the rivalry. Yale's 21–14 victory over Harvard in Cambridge in 2016 ended the streak.

The Game is significant for historical reasons as the rules of The Game soon were adopted by other schools.  Football's rules, conventions, and equipment, as well as elements of "atmosphere" such as the mascot and fight song, include many elements pioneered or nurtured at Harvard and Yale.

Princeton

The series with Princeton dates to 1873.

Yale Bowl

The Yale Bowl is Yale's football stadium in New Haven, Connecticut about 1-1/2 miles west of Yale's main campus. Completed in 1914, the stadium seats 61,446, reduced by renovations from the original capacity of 70,869.

Ground was broken on the stadium in August 1913.  It was the first bowl-shaped stadium in the country, and provided inspiration for the design of such stadiums as the Los Angeles Memorial Coliseum, the Rose Bowl, and Michigan Stadium. Through its inspiration of the Rose Bowl stadium, its name is also the origin of college football's bowl games. It was the perfect setting for New Haven native Albie Booth, also known as "Little Boy Blue" to perform his heroics vs. Army in November 1929 and for the 47-yard "kick that made history" by Randall "Randy" C. Carter, '77, snapped by the stalwart center from Illinois, Ralph Bosch, '77 and surely placed by John "Nubes" Nubani, '78, in the last seconds of the 1975 Yale-Dartmouth game to win the game for Yale, 16–14. The victory lifted head coach Carm Cozza into a tie with the legendary Walter Camp for most victories by a Bulldog mentor. The current scoreboard (notable for the time clock being arranged vertically instead of horizontally) was added in 1958, and in 1986 the current press box was added.  Yale hosted Penn in the first night football game at the Bowl on October 21, 2016. Penn defeated Yale in the game, 42–7. The Bowl was declared a National Historic Landmark in 1987.

College Football Hall of Fame inductees
As of 2017, 29 Yale Bulldogs players and coaches have been inducted into the College Football Hall of Fame.

Yale players in the NFL

More than 25 players from Yale have gone on to play in the National Football League, including running backs Calvin Hill, Chuck Mercein and Chris Hetherington, defensive backs Dick Jauron, Gary Fencik and Kenny Hill, tight ends Eric Johnson and John Spagnola, quarterback Brian Dowling, and linemen Fritz Barzilauskas, Century Milstead and Mike Pyle.

All-Americans

Since the first All-American team was selected by Caspar Whitney in 1889, more than 100 Yale football players have been selected as first-team All-Americans.  Consensus All-Americans are noted below with bold typeface.
 1889: Amos Alonzo Stagg (End), Charles O. Gill (T), Pudge Heffelfinger (G)
 1890: William Rhodes (T), Pudge Heffelfinger, Lee McClung (HB)
 1891: Frank Hinkey (End), John A. Hartwell (End), Wallace Winter (T), Pudge Heffelfinger (G), Lee McClung (HB)
 1892: Frank Hinkey (End), Alexander Hamilton Wallis (T), Vance McCormick (HB)
 1893: Frank Hinkey (End), Bill Hickock (G), Frank Butterworth (HB)
 1894: Frank Hinkey (End), Anson Beard (T), Bill Hickock (G), Phillip Stillman (C), George Adee (QB), Frank Butterworth (FB)
 1895: Fred Murphy (T), Sam Thorne (HB)
 1896: Lyman Bass (End), Fred Murphy (T), Burr Chamberlain (C), Clarence Fincke (QB)
 1897: John Hall (End), Burr Chamberlain (T), Rodgers (T), Gordon Brown (G), Charles Chadwick (G), George Cadwalader (C), Charles de Saulles (QB)
 1898: Burr Chamberlain (G), Gordon Brown (G), Malcolm McBride (HB)
 1899: George Stillman (T), Gordon Brown (G), Albert Sharpe (HB), Malcolm McBride (FB)
 1900: Sherman Coy (End), George Stillman (T), James Bloomer (T), Gordon Brown (G), Herman Olcott (C), George Chadwick (HB), William Finck (HB), Albert Sharpe (HB), Perry Hale (FB) Charles Gould (End)
 1901: James Hogan (T), Herman Olcott (G), Henry Holt (C)
 1902: Tom Shevlin (End), Ralph Kinney (T), James Hogan (T), Edgar Glass (G), Henry Holt (C), Foster Rockwell (QB), George Chadwick (HB), Harold Metcalf (HB), Morgan Bowman (FB)
 1903: Charles Rafferty (End), Tom Shevlin (End), James Hogan (T), James Bloomer (G), Foster Rockwell (QB), Harold Metcalf (HB), Ledyard Mitchell (FB)
 1904: Tom Shevlin (End), Neal (End), James Hogan (T), James Bloomer (T), Ralph Kinney (G), Roswell Tripp (G), Clint Roraback (C), Foster Rockwell (QB), Lydig Hoyt (HB)
 1905: Tom Shevlin (End), Roswell Tripp (G), Guy Hutchinson (QB), Howard Roome (HB)
 1906: Robert Forbes (End), Lucius Horatio Biglow (T), Arthur Brides (G), Clarence Hockenberger (C),  Tad Jones (QB), Hugh Knox (HB), Paul Veeder (FB), Samuel F.B. Morse (FB)
 1907: Clarence Alcott (End), Lucius Horatio Biglow (T), Tad Jones (QB), Ted Coy (FB)
 1908: William Goebel (G), Hamlin Andrus (G), Ted Coy (FB)
 1909: John Kilpatrick (End), Henry Hobbs (T), Hamlin Andrus (G), Carroll Cooney (C), Stephen Philbin (HB), Ted Coy (FB)
 1910: John Kilpatrick (End), Jim Scully (T), Fred J. Daly (HB)
 1911: Douglas Bomeisler (End), Jim Scully (T), Pomeroy Francis (G), Hank Ketcham (C), Art Howe (QB), Jesse Philbin (FB)
 1912: Douglas Bomeisler (End), Carroll T. Cooney (G), Hank Ketcham (C)
 1913: Ben Avery (End), Bud Talbott (T), John Pendleton (G), Hank Ketcham (G), William Marting (C)
 1914: Red Brann (End), Bud Talbott (T), Harry LeGore (FB)
 1915: Clinton Black (G)
 1916: Charles Comerford (End), George Moseley (End), Clinton Black (G), Lawrence Fox (G)
 1920: Tim Callahan (G), John Acosta (G)
 1921: Malcolm Aldrich (HB)
 1922: Harry Cross (G), Phillip Cruikshank (G)
 1923: Century Milstead (T), Bill Mallory (FB)
 1924: Richard Luman (End), Johnny Joss (T), Winslow Lovejoy (C), Ducky Pond (HB)
 1925: Johnny Joss (T), Herbert Sturhahn (G)
 1926: Herbert Sturhahn (G)
 1927: Dwight Fishwick (End), Sidney Quarrier (T), Bill Webster (G), John Charlesworth (C), Bruce Caldwell (HB)
 1929: Wade Greene (G), Albie Booth (QB)
 1930: Frederick Linehan (G)
 1932: Robert Lassiter (HB)
 1936: Larry Kelley (End), Clint Frank (QB)
 1937: Clint Frank (QB)
 1942: Spencer Moseley (C)
 1944: Paul Walker (End)
 1945: Paul Walker (End)
 1960: Ben Balme (G)
 1970: Tom Neville (T)
 1972: Dick Jauron (RB)
 1977: John Pagliaro (RB)
 1981: Rich Diana (RB)

See also
 List of NCAA football teams by wins

References

External links
 

 
American football teams established in 1872
1872 establishments in Connecticut